The African Rally Championship (ARC) is an international automobile rally championship run under the auspicies of the FIA. The championship was first held in 1981 and won by Shekhar Mehta. The most successful driver in the championship's history is Zambian driver Satwant Singh with eight championships. The reigning champion are Zambia's Leroy Gomes and navigator Urshlla Gomes

The championship has been held widely across the African continent, including the island of Madagascar, although few events are held in or north of the Sahara. The championship has frequently incorporated World Rally Championship events, particularly Africa's two most popular rallies, the Safari Rally in Kenya and the Ivory Coast Rally in Côte d'Ivoire. It is most popular in former British colonies.

Presently the African rally championship events are held in Côte d'Ivoire, Burundi, Zambia, Kenya, Uganda, Tanzania and Rwanda.

Events
Rally of Tanzania
Pearl of Africa Rally (Uganda)
Safari Rally (Kenya)
Zimbabwe Challenge - Not Currently on the Championship Calendar
Zambia International Motor Rally
Rwanda Mountain Gorilla Rally
Equator Rally (Kenya)
Mountain Gorilla Rally (Rwanda)
Rallye Côte d'Ivoire
Rally South Africa - Not Currently on the Championship Calendar
Tara Rally (Namibia)- Not Currently on the Championship Calendar
Rallye International de Madagascar - Not Currently on the Championship Calendar
Burundi International Rally - Joining the 2023 FIA African Rally Championship

Champions

References

External links
Official website

 
FIA Zone rally championships
Rally Championship
Recurring sporting events established in 1981